Nancy Etcoff (born 1955) is a psychologist and researcher at Harvard University. Etcoff has maintained a private practice in psychology, and taught classes about the mind, brain, behavior, and aesthetics at Harvard Medical School. Etcoff is best known for her 1999 book Survival of the Prettiest: the Science of Beauty arguing for a biological basis for beauty linked to evolutionary psychology.

Education 
Etcoff earned her B.A from Brown University. She initially studied comparative literature before switching her major to psychology. She received an M.Ed. from Harvard University and earned her Ph.D. in psychology at Boston University. After this, she completed her postdoctoral fellowship in brain and cognitive sciences at the Massachusetts Institute of Technology.

Work and research 
Etcoff is an associate professor of Harvard Medical School and works as a psychologist at the Massachusetts General Hospital. Etcoff serves as the director of the Psychiatric Neuroimaging Laboratories Program in Aesthetics and Well-Being, and is on the advisory board of the Peabody Essex Museum.

Psychology of beauty and happiness 
Etcoff teaches seminars in neuroaesthetics. In her 1999 book Survival of the Prettiest: the Science of Beauty, she rejects the notion of beauty as a cultural construct, an invention of the fashion industry, or a backlash against feminism. Instead Etcoff argues that human beauty perception is a biological artefact derived from evolutionary genetic pressure. This book was the basis of a one-hour Discovery Channel episode.  Etcoff has made many appearances in mainstream US media on the subject of beauty including the New York Times and Good Morning America. Etcoff has given a TED talk  "Happiness and Its Surprises", and appeared on NPR's TED Radio Hour. Etcoff's definitions of human happiness have been reported by Harvard Medical Magazine.

Scientific publications 
In 2017, Etcoff was co-author of Zen and the Art of Living Mindfully: The Health-Enhancing Potential of Zen Aesthetics. She has 15 earlier publications, primarily on facial expressions and facial attractiveness, listed at Medline.

Personal life 
Etcoff was born in 1955. Etcoff was married to the cognitive psychologist Steven Pinker from 1980 to 1992.

References

Living people
Harvard Medical School faculty
Boston University alumni
Brown University alumni
Harvard Graduate School of Education alumni
American women psychologists
21st-century American psychologists
1955 births
American women academics
21st-century American women
20th-century American psychologists